The First presidential inauguration of Álvaro Uribe marked the first term of the presidency of Álvaro Uribe, an administration that would later be postponed for four more years. He was inaugurated one more time with Vice President Francisco Santos.

After the victory and his arduous presidential campaign, Uribe became the first president of Colombia in 50 years of history not to belong to any of the traditional political streams that had been running the nation, they are the Liberal Party and the Conservative Party.

Background
Álvaro Uribe, the former Liberal governor of Antioquia (1995-1997), entered the race as a strong opponent of the peace talks with the FARC, but originally suffered from low name recognition against other better-known candidates. Uribe declined to participate in a Liberal primary, citing the lack of guarantees, and instead launched an independent candidacy (by collecting signatures from voters to win ballot access) with the backing of the Colombia First (Primero Colombia) movement.

Uribe entered the field taking a hardline position against the peace talks with the FARC, arguing that peace talks should only be held following the cessation of hostilities and terrorist actions.

Ceremony
The ceremony began as usual at 3:00 pm local time, Álvaro Uribe in the company of his wife Lina and their sons Tomas and Jeronimo left the Palacio de San Carlos towards the Plaza de Bolivar where more than 200 guests and dignitaries from 11 awaited them. countries, in the same way minutes before Francisco Santos entered in the company of his wife, during his walk towards the Plaza de Bolívar he was escorted by the traditional pipers of the national army.

The presidential inauguration ceremony was sabotaged due to terrorism, by the FARC, Álvaro Uribe's main enemy, on the morning of August 7, 2002, just a few hours after the presidential inauguration, subversives launched 14 projectiles of 120 millimeters against the congress building, resulting in 17 and 64 injuries, which was described by public opinion as a sabotage.

A few days before, a car bomb had been detonated on the night of Saturday, August 5, in a financial and commercial area in the north of Bogotá. The DAS assured that the FARC intended to shoot down the helicopter in which Uribe was going to travel to attend the ceremony. of possession, which forced a large security coverage to be deployed, taking on August 6, one day before the possession, the decision that the event was closed to the public and that it would only be directed to international guests as well as to dignitaries who attended the inauguration event, this was the first time that a presidential inauguration event in Colombia was held privately, when the tradition had been formed as an event for the people where they used to shout slogans and listen to harangues by of the president-elect, The last rulers were sworn in in the Plaza de Bolívar, outdoors.

Inaugural address
In his inaugural speech, Uribe highlighted the idea of the challenge that the unifying bond of law, democratic authority, freedom and social justice means.

See also
 2002 Colombian presidential election
 Álvaro Uribe
 Francisco Santos
 First inauguration of Juan Manuel Santos

References

Uribe, Álvaro
Presidency of Álvaro Uribe
2002 in Colombia
2002 in politics
August 2002 events in South America